Rose Hill Farm may refer to:

Rose Hill Farmstead (Vincennes, Indiana), formerly listed on the NRHP in Indiana
Rose Hill Farm (Upperville, Virginia), listed on the NRHP in Virginia
Rose Hill Farm (Winchester, Virginia), listed on the NRHP in Virginia
Rose Hill Farm (Shepherdstown, West Virginia), listed on the NRHP in West Virginia

See also
Rose Hill